Oiniades is a municipal unit of the municipality Missolonghi, Greece. The municipal unit has an area of 270.899 km2. It was named after the ancient town of Oeniadae.

History
Ancient Oeniadae was a port town on the west bank of the river Achelous and one of the most important towns of ancient Acarnania. Oeniadai was first mentioned in the 5th century BC.

It was situated against a hill in the marshes, which protected it from invaders. Its location has been identified on that of the present village Katochi.

It was an important port on the route to Corfu. It changed its alliances repeatedly in the course of history; at first it was a member of the Peloponnesian League, but in 424 BC it was incorporated in the Delian League. In the Hellenistic period, Oiniadai allied with the Aetolians until 218 BC when Philip V declared it free. From 211-189 BC during the Roman-Macedonian wars the city was again under Aetolian control. In Roman times it lost its strategic importance. However it was still inhabited in the 3rd century AD judging from coin finds.

Archaeology
The city walls are well preserved and several buildings were excavated beginning in 1900-1901:
a theatre
a bath complex
a shipyard.

Municipality

Subdivisions
The municipal unit Oiniades is subdivided into the following communities (constituent villages in brackets):
Neochori Mesolongiou (Neochori, Magoula, Marmara)
Gouria
Katochi
Lesini
Mastros (Mastros, Platania)
Pentalofo

Population

References

External links
Municipality of Oiniades 
Oiniades (municipality) on GTP Travel Pages
Ancient Oeniadae on GTP Travel Pages
Ancient Oeniadae access information
jstor.org, Oeniadae: I. History and Topography by Benjamin Powell, 1904

Acarnania
Former populated places in Greece
Missolonghi
Populated places in Aetolia-Acarnania